Pesah Grupper (21 August 1924 – 29 April 2013) was an Israeli politician who served as Minister of Agriculture between October 1983 and September 1984.

Biography
Grupper was born in Tel Aviv during the Mandate era. He served as head of Atlit local council between 1959 and 1962 and again from 1969 until 1971.

He was elected to the Knesset on Likud's list in 1973, and retained his seat in elections in 1977 and 1981. In August 1981 he was appointed Deputy Minister of Agriculture, a role he held until 1983, when he became Minister of Agriculture in Yitzhak Shamir's government. Although re-elected in 1984, he lost his place in the cabinet. Following re-election in 1988, in March 1990 Grupper and four other Likud MKs left the party to form the Party for the Advancement of the Zionist Idea (later renamed New Liberal Party). The party ran in the 1992 elections, but failed to cross the electoral threshold, resulting in Grupper losing his seat.

External links
 

1924 births
2013 deaths
People from Tel Aviv
Likud politicians
New Liberal Party (Israel) politicians
Members of the 8th Knesset (1974–1977)
Members of the 9th Knesset (1977–1981)
Members of the 10th Knesset (1981–1984)
Members of the 11th Knesset (1984–1988)
Members of the 12th Knesset (1988–1992)
Deputy ministers of Israel
Ministers of Agriculture of Israel